The election for Resident Commissioner to the United States House of Representatives took place on November 3,1992, the same day as the larger Puerto Rican general election and the United States elections, 1992.

Candidates for Resident Commissioner
 Carlos Romero Barcelo for the New Progressive Party
 Antonio Colorado for the Popular Democratic Party
 Victor García San Inocencio for the Puerto Rican Independence Party

Election results

See also 
Puerto Rican general election, 1992

References 

1992 Puerto Rico elections
Puerto Rico
1992